Edward Thornborough (born c. 1563) was an English politician from Shoddesden.

He was a Member (MP) of the Parliament of England for Ludgershall in 1593.

References

1560s births
Year of death missing
Politicians from Hampshire
English MPs 1593
Place of birth missing
Members of Parliament for Ludgershall